René Alix (14 September 1907 – 30 December 1966) was a French organist, choral conductor and composer.

Biography 
Born in Sotteville-lès-Rouen, René Alix studied music in Rouen with Marcel Lanquetuit, in Paris with Georges Caussade and Albert Bertelin. He was organist at the Saint-Michel church of Le Havre from 1929 to 1939. In 1945 he directed the choirs of the RTF then in 1954 he was appointed director of the École César Franck. The author of a reference musical grammar, he has written piano and organ pieces, masses, one string quartet, melodies, symphonic poems, (Les Revenants, Danses, Confidences) and an oratorio, Les Saintes Heures de Jeanne d'Arc (1954).

In 1962, he was awarded the Grand Prix de la Ville de Paris.

Alix died in Paris on 30 December 1966

Works

Opera 
 Yolande, opéra comique (1937)

Orchestral music 
 Revenants, ballade symphonique (1945)
 Suite brève, for piano and strings (1948)
 Concerto pour piano et orchestre, Op. 16 (1949)
 Danses et confidences, suite (1950)

Choral music 
 Les Très saintes heures de Jeanne d'Arc, oratorio (1954)
 Messe, for soloists, choir and orchestra (1955)
 Messe matutinale, for a cappella choir (1958)

Chamber music 
 Sonata for violin and piano (1938)
 2 string quartets (1954)

Sources 
Alain Pâris, Dictionnaire des interprètes Bouquins/Laffont 1988, (p. 149)

External links 
 René Alix on Musicalics
 René Alix on Discogs
 René Alix on Leoncedesaintmartin.fr
 René Alix (1907-1966) : Piano Concerto (1948) on YouTube

French classical organists
French male organists
20th-century French composers
French composers of sacred music
French opera composers
Male opera composers
French choral conductors
French male conductors (music)
1907 births
People from Seine-Maritime
1966 deaths
20th-century organists
20th-century French conductors (music)
20th-century French male musicians
Male classical organists